Qahremanluy-e Sofla (also Romanized as Qahremānlūy-e Soflá; also known as Qahremānlū-ye Soflá) is a village in Bash Qaleh Rural District, in the Central District of Urmia County, West Azerbaijan Province, Iran. At the 2006 census, its population was 257, in 77 families.

References 

Populated places in Urmia County